Iwanowice-Naboków  is a village in the administrative district of Gmina Opatów, within Kłobuck County, Silesian Voivodeship, in southern Poland.

The village has a population of 131.

References

Villages in Kłobuck County